Lufeng railway station is a railway station located in Guangdong Province, People's Republic of China, on the Xiamen–Shenzhen railway which operated by Guangzhou Railway (Group) Corp., China Railway Corporation.

Railway stations in Guangdong